Spondylidini is a tribe of beetles in the family Spondylidinae, containing the following genera and species:

 Genus Neospondylis
 Neospondylis mexicanus (Bates, 1879)
 Neospondylis upiformis (Mannerheim, 1843)
 Genus Scaphinus
 Scaphinus muticus (Fabricius, 1801)
 Genus Spondylis
 Spondylis buprestoides (Fabricius, 1775)

References

Spondylidinae